State Road 442 (NM 442) is a  state highway in the US state of New Mexico. NM 442's southern terminus is at NM 518 in La Cueva, and the northern terminus is at NM 120 in Ocate.  The J.P. Strong Store is located at that terminus.

Major intersections

See also

References

442
Transportation in Mora County, New Mexico